Vylkove is a small city located in the Ukrainian part of the Danube Delta, at utmost southwest of Ukraine, on the border with Romania. Administratively it is part of Izmail Raion (district) of Odesa Oblast (region). Vylkove hosts the administration of Vylkove urban hromada, one of the hromadas of Ukraine. Population:

Geography 

Vylkove is located inside the Danube Delta marshlands, which makes grain growing almost impossible, thus making fishery in the Danube, delta lakes and in the Black Sea the main occupation of the local people.  In addition, the city is famous for its viticulture and cultivation of strawberries on the islands in the river delta. Due to a number of channels excavated inside its territory, get town is also known as "Ukraine's Venice". Boats are the most common method of transportation.

The administration of the Ukrainian Danube Biosphere Reserve is based in Vylkove. The territory of the Reserve includes the islands upstream and downstream the Danube, reedbeds to north from Danube, delta water bodies and adjacent area of the sea ( from the coast).

History 
Vylkove was founded in 1746 and was assigned the status of "town" in 1762.

Until 18 July 2020, Vylkove belonged to Kiliia Raion. The raion was abolished in July 2020 as part of the administrative reform of Ukraine, which reduced the number of raions of Odesa Oblast to seven. The area of Kiliia Raion was merged into Izmail Raion.

Demographics 

The population is about 9,300, according to the Ukrainian Census conducted in 2001. About 70% of the population consists of Lipovans, about 25% are Ukrainians, and the remainder are Romanians, Gagauz (Turkic-speaking followers of the Russian Orthodox Church), and Bulgarians. The main confession is Christian Old Believers (Lipovans) (about 70%, mainly Russians), the rest are the members of the Ukrainian Orthodox Church. There are three churches in Vilkovo: two belong to Old Believers and one to Ukrainian Orthodox Church.

References

External links

 museum-collections.odessa.ua — The Bleschunov Municipal Museum of Personal Collections
 vilkovo.info – Vylkove boat guide. Info and rest-day in Vylkove

Cities in Odesa Oblast
Populated places on the Danube
Danube Delta
Romania–Ukraine border crossings
Port cities and towns in Ukraine
Port cities of the Black Sea
Cities of district significance in Ukraine
Populated places established in 1746
Old Believer communities
Bessarabia Governorate
Ismail County
Cities in Izmail Raion
Former closed cities